Anadyomene is a genus of thalloid green algae comprising 19 species.

Species
The valid species currently considered to belong to this genus are:
A. aruensis
A. brownii
A. circumsepta
A. crispa
A. eseptata
A. flabellata
A. howei
A. lacerata
A. leclancheri
A. lenormandii
A. linkiana
A. menziesii
A. muelleri
A. pavonina
A. plicata
A. rhizoidifera
A. saldanhae
A. stellata
A. wrightii

References

External links
Images of Anadyomene at Algaebase

Cladophorales genera
Anadyomenaceae